is a group of two manga artists consisting of Hitoshi Ota and Terumasa Shichinohe. Their anime also tends to have a happier ending after the credits on each last episode.

Recurring characters
Since Kannazuki no Miko, the characters of Himeko Kurusugawa and Chikane Himemiya appear in the following Kaishaku projects: as Kuu (in personality and characteristics)/Himiko (in name, appearance and love interest) and Kaon in Kyoshiro to Towa no Sora, also as Tendo Hikaru and Utashiro Haruka in Hazama no Uta, in Himegami no Miko as Himeko Hinomiya and Chikane Kouzuki, in The Cross Triangle as Kurusu Erekishgal and Kiraha Azatoth, and recently as Himeko Kurusu and Chikane Manamiya in Zettai Shōjo Seiiki Amnesian.

Another recurring character is that of Ōgami Souma from Kannazuki no Miko, who's also appeared as Ōgami Jin in Kyoshiro to Towa no Sora, Ogami/Okami in The Cross Triangle, Ōmiwa Souma in Himegami no Miko, and as just Ogami in Zettai Shōjo Seiiki Amnesian.

Created manga series
 Steel Angel Kurumi (1998)
 Magical Meow Meow Taruto (2001)
 
 UFO Ultramaiden Valkyrie (2002)
 Kagihime Monogatari Eikyū Alice Rondo (2004)
 Kannazuki no Miko (2004)
 Shattered Angels (2006)
 Hazama no Uta (2007)
 Tokyo Gensō Gakuen Yūsha-Ka: Tsukiiro no Noel (2008)
 Zettai Shōjo Seiiki Amnesian (2009)
 Neko-kyuu 9 (2010)
 
 
 
 2 x 2 (2014)
 Aka Akatoretachi no Monogatari (2014)
 Himegami no Miko (2020)

References

External links
  Kaishaku Official Website
 

Manga artists